Anthony Patrick Borsumato (born 13 December 1973 in Nunthorpe, Middlesbrough) is a male retired English athlete who specialised in the 400 metres hurdles.

Athletics career
He represented Great Britain at the 2000 Summer Olympics, as well as three World Championships. He represented England in the 400 metres hurdles event, at the 1998 Commonwealth Games in Kuala Lumpur, Malaysia. Four years later he represented England again at the 2002 Commonwealth Games.

His career came to an abrupt end when he broke his ankle during the semifinals of the 2003 World Championships in Athletics.

His personal best in the event is 48.90 from 2002.

Competition record

References

1973 births
Living people
People from Nunthorpe
British male hurdlers
Athletes (track and field) at the 2000 Summer Olympics
Athletes (track and field) at the 1998 Commonwealth Games
Athletes (track and field) at the 2002 Commonwealth Games
Olympic athletes of Great Britain
Sportspeople from Yorkshire
World Athletics Championships athletes for Great Britain
Commonwealth Games competitors for England